Yıldıray is a Turkish given name. Notable people with the name include:

 Yıldıray Baştürk (born 1978), Turkish footballer
 Yıldıray Çınar (born 1976), Turkish comic book artist

Turkish masculine given names